James Blanton (October 5, 1918 – July 30, 1942) was an American jazz double bassist. Blanton is credited with being the originator of more complex pizzicato and arco bass solos in a jazz context than previous bassists. Nicknamed "Jimmie," Blanton's nickname is usually misspelled as "Jimmy," including by Duke Ellington.

Early life
Blanton was born in Chattanooga, Tennessee. He originally learned to play the violin, but took up the bass while at Tennessee State University, performing with the Tennessee State Collegians from 1936 to 1937, and during the vacations with Fate Marable.

Later life and career
Blanton left university in 1938 to play full-time in St Louis with the Jeter-Pillars Orchestra. Blanton joined Duke Ellington's band in 1939. On November 22 of that year, Blanton and Ellington recorded two tracks – "Blues" and "Plucked Again" – which were the first commercially recorded piano–bass duets. Further duet recordings were made in 1940, and Blanton was also featured in orchestra tracks. "Blanton also took part in a few of the informal jam sessions at Minton's Playhouse in New York that contributed to the genesis of the bop style." He had to leave Ellington's band near the end of 1941, because of poor health.

Ellington put Blanton front-and-center on the bandstand nightly, unheard of for a bassist at the time. Such was his importance to Ellington's band at the time, together with tenor saxophonist Ben Webster, that it became known as the Blanton–Webster band. Blanton also played in the "small group" sessions led by Barney Bigard, Rex Stewart, Johnny Hodges, and Cootie Williams in 1940-41.

In 1941, Blanton was diagnosed with tuberculosis. Blanton died on July 30, 1942, at a sanatorium in Duarte, California, aged 23.

Playing style and influence
When with the Jeter-Pillars Orchestra, Blanton added classical music pizzicato and arco techniques to jazz bass, making it into more of a solo instrument. While with Ellington, Blanton revolutionized the way the double bass was used in jazz. His virtuosity placed him in a different class from his predecessors, making him the first master of the jazz bass and demonstrating its potential as a solo instrument. "He possessed great dexterity and range, roundness of tone, accurate intonation, and above all an unprecedented sense of swing." He added "many non-harmonic passing notes in his accompaniment lines, giving them a contrapuntal flavour and stimulating soloists to their own harmonic explorations." His originality was developed by others into the foundations of the bebop rhythm section. His importance was such that, "until the advent of the styles of Scott LaFaro and Charlie Haden in the 1960s all modern bass players drew on his innovations."

Discography
 Never No Lament (Jazz: Bluebird, 2003)
 Things Ain't What They Used To Be (Jazz: RCA Victor, 1966)

References

Sources
 "Jimmy Blanton". African American Almanac. 9th ed. Gale, 2003. Student Resource Center. Thomson Gale. 11 April 2006

1918 births
1942 deaths
African-American musicians
American jazz double-bassists
Male double-bassists
20th-century deaths from tuberculosis
Duke Ellington Orchestra members
People from Chattanooga, Tennessee
Tennessee State University alumni
20th-century American musicians
20th-century double-bassists
American male jazz musicians
Jeter-Pillars Orchestra members
Tuberculosis deaths in California
20th-century American male musicians